Mbissel is a village in the west of Sénégal. It is situated in the region of Fatick. The population is overrun by the Serer people.

History 

Mbissel was the capital of the first Guelowar king of Sine - Maad a Sinig Maysa Wali Jaxateh Manneh commonly known as Maysa Wali Jon. Maysa Wali made it his capital in the 14th century.

The area just like the whole of Sine and Saloum has many historical monuments.  The traditional site of the tomb of Maysa Wali is located in Mbissel.

See also 

Kingdom of Sine
Kingdom of Saloum
Serer people
Maat Sine Kumba Ndoffene Famak Joof (King of Sine 1853 - 1871)
Guelowar
Serer religion
Mossane, a 1996 film directed by Safi Faye

Notes

External links
Senegal culture
Mbissel, the site of PEPAM 

Serer country